CobbLinc (formerly Cobb Community Transit) is the bus public transit system in Cobb County, Georgia, one of metro Atlanta's three most populous suburban counties.  (The others are Gwinnett County, which operates Gwinnett County Transit and Clayton County, which formerly operated Clayton County C-TRAN but is now served by MARTA.)

Operation

CobbLinc began operations in July 1989 (as Cobb Community Transit) and has had relatively strong ridership (3,793,253 total passengers in 2005) since then. The hub is along South Marietta Parkway in Marietta, just west of the former Southern Polytechnic State University now the Marietta campus of Kennesaw State University. Routes connect to the most populated areas of the county, including Mableton and Kennesaw.  Express routes also operate down to Atlanta, connecting with MARTA at the Arts Center station.  Transfers are free between MARTA and CCT, though both transit agencies charge the same fare ($2.50) with a Breeze Card. CobbLinc's annual operating budget is about $12.9 million (2004), from fares and the general county budget, as well as Federal grants.

All buses make automatic announcements inside the bus of upcoming stops and major roads, and stop requests from passengers.  This is done by pre-recorded voice announcements for the vision-impaired and LED message signs for the hearing-impaired.  External announcements are also made by voice, in addition to the normal electronic signs. Some buses also run on compressed natural gas (CNG) rather than diesel.

Planning
Along with Gwinnett, Cobb voted against MARTA in the 1970s, and thus was left out of the system.  The lack of sales tax revenue from the two counties stunted the growth of MARTA, however the GRTA created by former governor of Georgia Roy Barnes has been seeking to create other solutions, such as possible light rail to Cobb through the Cumberland Mall and Town Center at Cobb areas.  Other solutions proposed include special bus-only lanes on Interstate 75, and commuter rail into Cherokee County.  A cross-suburb line over to Gwinnett County has also been proposed, intersecting with a future extended MARTA north line between Roswell and Sandy Springs in Fulton County.

2019 Light Rail Proposal
In May 2010 Cobb's Board of Commissioners approved further funding to study a light rail line from the Cumberland/Galleria area to the Town Center/KSU area. The proposed line would be constructed and operational by 2019 with the expectation of nearly 50,000 riders daily by 2025. At each end of the line, a circulator bus system has also been proposed bringing the total expected ridership for the new combined LRT/BRT system to nearly 100,000. The project would be funded and operated through both federal and local sources. As of 2010, it is unclear whether or not the new transit system would be operated by CCT, a new agency, or even another existing agency such as MARTA.

Flex Busses and Shuttles 
In 2015, Flex buses were added in Cobb County. They are organized into three zones in Powder Springs and Austell. There is also a Cumberland CID circulator shuttle.

Express 
Cobb operates five GRTA Express routes, funded by GRTA. Express route 476 serves Douglas County, Powder Springs and Hiram park and rides. Route 463 serves Douglas County MMTC and West Douglas. Route 480, 483, and 490 serve Town Center. 480 continues to Acworth. 483 and 490 continue to Woodstock, and then 490 continues to Canton.

Shortfalls

CobbLinc generally serves the core portions of the county, and the Six Flags area, with little to no service to the West and East sides.  Acworth, as well as the greater northwestern area of the county,  lack local service, with only express routes operating out of the newly renovated Acworth Park and Ride lot.  East Cobb has no routes at all after route 65 was shut down.  In East and West Cobb there are many county-owned facilities, such as the East Cobb Regional Library, West Cobb Regional Library, West Cobb Aquatic Center and Mountain View Aquatic Center that have no service at all. West Cobb only has three flex zones in the Southwest portion, and one GRTA Express route operated by Cobb County. Other busy throughways that have no service - natural spots for transit corridors - include but are not limited to Dallas Highway (in West Cobb) and the northern end of Cobb Parkway.  Other complaints include infrequent service to MARTA stations as well as a complete shutdown of the system every Sunday and on Holidays, as opposed to other regional operators, which operate reduced schedules on these days.

Routes
Most routes begin and end at the Marietta Transfer Center, though several operate from the Cumberland Boulevard Transfer Center.

Local
10: Marietta to Cumberland Mall via U.S. Route 41, then to MARTA Arts Center station
15: Marietta, south to County Services Parkway, then Windy Hill Road west to Wildwood office park
20: Marietta to Cumberland Mall, via South Cobb Drive
30: Marietta to MARTA H. E. Holmes station, including Mableton and Six Flags Over Georgia
35:Cobb Hospital to MARTA H. E. Holmes station including Austell  [Discontinued **]
40: North to Town Center Mall (at J. C. Penney) near Kennesaw, along Bells Ferry Road
45: Similar to 40, but along U.S. 41 instead; ends at Town Center Mall via Kennesaw State University
50: Marietta to Cumberland Mall, via Powers Ferry Road
65: East along Roswell Road, south along Johnson Ferry Road to Johnson Ferry Baptist  Church, Park and Ride Lot, rush hours also to MARTA Dunwoody station, in DeKalb County [Discontinued **]
70: Cumberland Mall west to WellStar Cobb Hospital and Cobb County Health Center via East-West Connector and Powder Springs Road, including Home Depot world headquarters [Discontinued **]
 ** Discontinued August 1, 2011

Express
Express buses run only during peak hours, and only weekdays.  Morning buses run only to Atlanta, afternoon buses only from Atlanta.  All buses run via I-75, I-575 and I-20, and charge a fare of three dollars one-way, four for a round trip.

.   10X: Upcoming route to replace 10A,10B,10C routes on summer 2019

100: "North Cobb Express", Kennesaw (Busbee Park and Ride Lot) to MARTA Civic Center station, then to Five Points
101: "Marietta Express", Marietta (Transfer Center) to MARTA Arts Center station, and Peachtree Street at Luckie Street
102: "Acworth to Midtown", Acworth (Acworth Park and Ride Lot) to MARTA Arts Center station
476 (GRTA Xpress Route): "Hiram-Powder Springs to Atlanta", Hiram (Hiram 278 Theater Park and Ride Lot) and Powder Springs to MARTA Civic Center and Arts Center stations
475/75 (GRTA Xpress Route): "Austell to Atlanta", South Cobb County (unincorporated) and Six Flags Theme Park to the MARTA Civic Center station.
480 (GRTA Xpress Route): "Acworth to Atlanta", Busbee Park and Ride Lot to Five Points and the MARTA Civic Center station
481 (GRTA Xpress Route): "Children's Healthcare to Atlanta", Children's Healthcare Park and Ride Lot to Five Points and the MARTA Civic Center station

Park and Ride Lots and Transfer Centers
Marietta Transfer Center (MTC) Park and Ride @ South Marietta Parkway (SR 120 Loop) - Routes 10, 10C, 15, 20, 30, 40, 45, 50, 65 and 101 connect at the MTC
Busbee Park and Ride @ George Busbee Parkway - Express Route 100 and GRTA Route 480 connect at Busbee
Children's Healthcare Park and Ride @ Big Shanty Road - Express Route 100 and GRTA Route 481 connect at Children's Healthcare
Johnson Ferry Baptist Church Park and Ride @ Johnson Ferry Road - Route 65 connects at the Johnson Ferry Baptist Church
Powder Springs Park and Ride @ the Silver Comet Trail in Powder Springs, GA - GRTA Route 476 connects at Florence Road
Floyd Road Park and Ride @ the Silver Comet Trail in Mableton, GA -  Route 30 connect at Floyd Road
Acworth Park and Ride @ Lake Acworth Drive in Acworth, GA - Express Route 102 and GRTA Route 480 connect at Acworth
Cumberland Transfer Center (CTC) @ Cumberland Boulevard/Cumberland Mall (does not have a park and ride lot) - Routes 10, 10A, 10B, 20, 25, 50, 70 and MARTA Route 12 connect at the CTC

References

External links

CobbLinc website

Bus transportation in Georgia (U.S. state)
Transportation in Cobb County, Georgia